Heaven is a science fiction novel written by Ian Stewart and Jack Cohen. It was first published in 2004. It is a loose sequel to Wheelers.

The novel features spacefaring Neanderthals who were removed from Earth by powerful aliens for unspecified reasons.

References

2004 novels
Collaborative novels
Books by Ian Stewart (mathematician)
Fiction about neanderthals
Grand Central Publishing books